The Marilyn Diptych  (1962) is a silkscreen painting by American pop artist Andy Warhol depicting Marilyn Monroe. The monumental work is one of the artist's most noted of the movie star.  

The painting consists of 50 images. Each image of the actress is taken from the single publicity photograph from the film Niagara (1953). The underlying publicity photograph that Warhol used as a basis for his many paintings and prints of Marilyn, and the Marilyn Diptych, was owned and distributed by her movie studio. Marilyn Diptych was completed just weeks after Marilyn Monroe's death in August 1962. 

Silk-screening was the technique used to create this painting. The twenty-five images on the left are painted in color, the right side is black and white.

The Marilyn Diptych is in the collection of the Tate.

Analysis

It has been suggested that the relation between the left side of the canvas and the right side of the canvas is evocative of the relation between the celebrity's life and death. The work has received praise from writers such as American academic and cultural critic Camille Paglia, who wrote in 2012's Glittering Images lauding how it shows the "multiplicity of meanings" in Monroe's life and legacy.

In a December 2, 2004, article in The Guardian, the painting was named the third most influential piece of modern art in a survey of 500 artists, critics, and others. The artwork was also ranked ninth in the past 1,000 years by Kathleen Davenport, Director, Rice University Art Gallery, Houston.

Appropriation and fair use
Warhol is regarded as an artist known for the appropriation of images and he often made use of publicity photographs and publicly available photographs and motifs not owned by him, which often brought him into conflict with the owners of the source material.  An example of this is Warhol's Marilyn series including the Marilyn Diptych, which resulted in a settlement with the owner of the Marilyn Monroe publicity photograph which he used as the source material for the paintings. Warhol and his estate have settled many copyright disputes including with regard to his famous flowers paintings and paintings of Jackie Kennedy, as discussed in detail in "Andy The Appropriator: The Copyright Battles You Won't Hear About at The Whitney's Warhol Exhibit" from The Columbia Journal of Law & the Arts: "Although some of Warhol’s work was commissioned by individuals or companies, much of it was appropriated from other artists, photographers, and brands. Two of his most famous pieces, Marilyn Diptych and the collection of Campbell’s soup cans, are examples of his habit of appropriation. For the Marilyn series, Warhol took a promotional photograph of Marilyn Monroe and transferred it onto silkscreen print using different colors. He did not own the promotional photograph that he used and he did not have permission to use it. The resulting work was transformative enough that a strong fair use argument could be made today, but Warhol’s appropriation is undeniable. Similarly, Warhol used the Campbell’s Soup logo without permission from the company for dozens of silkscreen prints. Eventually, Campbell’s Soup tacitly approved of his use because of the free marketing they were receiving, but Warhol’s use of their logo without initial permission was still appropriation."

See also
 Gold Marilyn Monroe, another 1962 work by Warhol featuring Monroe
 Diptych

References

External links
 Analysis of Andy Warhol's Marilyn Monroe Series (1967), including Maryiln Diptych (1962)

Collection of the Tate galleries
1962 paintings
Paintings by Andy Warhol
Cultural depictions of Marilyn Monroe
Diptychs